A clapper is a basic form of percussion instrument. It consists of two long solid pieces that are struck together producing sound. A straightforward instrument to produce and play, they exist in many forms in many different cultures around the world. Clappers can take a number of forms and be made of a wide variety of material. Wood is most common, but metal and ivory have also been used. The plastic thundersticks that have recently come to be popular at sporting events can be considered a form of inflated plastic clapper.

Several specific forms of clapper have their own names, such as the Chinese guban, Japanese hyoshigi, or the Korean bak. In the classical music of Thailand, a similar instrument is called krap. In India cooking tongs or चिमटा itself is often used to provide rhythm while singing religious hymns in many cultures (sometimes tongs made specifically for the purpose are also equipped with bells). In Vietnam, the coin clapper called sinh tiền is widely used. In medieval French music, clappers called tablettes or cliquettes were used. In the Western symphony orchestra, a clapper called the whip (also called slapstick) is occasionally used in the percussion section.

Whip/slapstick

In music, a whip or slapstick is a clapper (percussion instrument) consisting of two wooden boards joined by a hinge at one end.  When the boards are brought together rapidly, the sound produces a sound reminiscent of the crack of a whip. It is often used in modern orchestras, bands, and percussion ensembles.

There are two types of whips. The first has two planks of wood connected by a hinge, with a handle on each. The percussionist holds the instrument by the handles and hits the two pieces of wood together, creating a loud whip noise. The other type also has two planks of wood, one longer than the other, with one handle, connected with a spring hinge so it can be played with just one hand, though it cannot produce sounds as loud as a whip requiring both hands. This second type of whip is technically a separate instrument called a slapstick.

Usage in classical music

The whip is sometimes indicated in scores by the native words for "whip" (French fouet, German Peitsche, or Italian frusta) or a term indicating the clapper construction (French claquette or German Holzklapper).

This list is alphabetical, but is by no means exhaustive.

See also
Bamboo clapper
Paiban
Scabellum, an ancient Greek and Roman foot-clapper on the sole of a sandal
Thattai (instrument), an Indian and Nepalese clapper
Torres Strait Islanders

References

Further reading
"Clapper." Encyclopædia Britannica.

External links 
 Clappers (Polish folk musical instruments)

Plaque concussion idiophones
Hand percussion
Orchestral percussion instruments
Unpitched percussion instruments